Carlia leucotaenia is a species of skink in the subfamily Eugongylinae. It is endemic to the Maluku Islands (=Moluccas) of Indonesia, specifically Seram and Ambon Islands.

Description
Males measure  and females  in snout–vent length. It is oviparous.

References

Carlia
Endemic fauna of Indonesia
Reptiles of Indonesia
Reptiles described in 1860
Taxa named by Pieter Bleeker